Hope Bay Aerodrome  is an aerodrome located near Hope Bay, Nunavut, Canada. The runway serves the gold exploration camps in the area.

Airlines and destinations

See also
Hope Bay greenstone belt

References

External links

Airports in the Arctic
Registered aerodromes in the Kitikmeot Region